Point Blank is a 2019 American action thriller film directed by Joe Lynch and written by Adam G. Simon. The film is a remake of the 2010 French film of the same name, originally called À bout portant. It stars Frank Grillo, Anthony Mackie, Marcia Gay Harden, Teyonah Parris, Boris McGiver, and Markice Moore.

It was digitally released on Netflix on July 12, 2019.

Plot
Abe Guevara is caught in a shootout at a residential home that results in the death of District Attorney Joshua Gregory. He is chased on foot and attempts to escape with his brother Mateo, but Abe is hit by a car, and is subsequently sent to a local hospital. A pair of homicide detectives, Regina Lewis and Eric Masterson, are assigned to the case.

Paul Booker, an everyman ER nurse, is assigned to oversee Abe's recovery at the hospital. Mateo, determined to break Abe out in order to pay off a debt with Big D, an influential gangster, kidnaps Paul's pregnant wife Taryn and coerces Paul into working for him. Paul breaks out Abe on his stretcher, and they evade detectives Lewis and Masterson just shortly after they arrive. Abe reveals that he is in possession of a flash drive, that can expose several corrupt police officers; while making the deal to distribute the flash drive to Gregory, they were ambushed, and Abe was wrongfully incriminated for his death. Abe arranges to meet Mateo at a bus station, but realizing that it is a sting operation, they incite a shootout and flee, engaging in a car chase. After fighting off more cops at a car wash, they escape on foot.

Seeking a new car, they consult a local gangster, Cheetah. Lewis and Masterson arrive, and hold them all at gunpoint. Masterson realizes that Lewis is one of the corrupt cops on the drive, leading her to kill both Masterson and Cheetah. Paul kills her accomplice Jones while she is distracted with incoming reinforcements. Abe rendezvouses with Mateo, but he is ambushed for the drive as well by one of Lewis' men, who abduct Taryn. Abe and Paul arrive at the rendezvous, only to find Mateo mortally wounded. He succumbs to his injuries, and dies. Lewis threatens the two, revealing that she is holding Taryn hostage.

Having taken into his possession security footage that incriminates Lewis of her corrupt actions, Abe finalizes a deal with Big D and pays off his debt. Big D stages a distraction outside the police precinct, both to accommodate to Paul and Abe, but to also capture footage for a movie he is developing. Disguised as a first responder and a police officer, Paul and Abe incapacitate Lewis, and save Taryn, who goes into labour and gives birth to their baby boy. In the aftermath, Lewis is killed by police reinforcements after Abe exposes her corruption.

One year later, Paul and Taryn celebrate their baby boy's first birthday, who they name Matty in Mateo's honor. Abe smiles upon seeing a picture of Matty's first birthday cake, and drives into the sunset, tailed by a black SUV.

Cast
 Anthony Mackie as Paul Booker, an ER nurse who later formed an alliance with Abe.
 Frank Grillo as Abe Guevara, a criminal who is trying to pay off a debt to a gang leader named Big D.
 Marcia Gay Harden as Lt. Regina Lewis, a corrupt cop.
 Teyonah Parris as Taryn Booker, Paul's pregnant wife.
 Boris McGiver as Eric Masterson
 Christian Cooke as Mateo Guevara, Abe's younger brother and partner in crime
 Markice Moore as Big D, a gang leader who wants to be a movie director.

Production
The project was announced in June 2018, with Joe Lynch directing and Frank Grillo and Anthony Mackie set to star in the lead roles. In July 2018, Marcia Gay Harden, Teyonah Parris, Boris McGiver, and Markice Moore joined the cast of the film. In August 2018, Christian Cooke joined the cast.

Principal production began on August 6, 2018 in Cincinnati. Locations include the lobby of the Dixie Terminal building, appearing as a train terminal during a chase scene.

Release
It was released on July 12, 2019.

Reception
The site's critical consensus reads, "Point Blank has its reasonably diverting moments, but high energy and fast-paced action can't disguise this remake's frustratingly middling storytelling." Metacritic assigned the film a weighted average score of 37 out of 100, based on 7 critics, indicating "generally unfavorable reviews".

Brian Tallerico of RogerEbert.com gave the film 2 out of 4 stars, saying that the filmmakers "know how to make dirty, no-fat action movies" but that the plot twists in combination with underdeveloped characters "will make you realize you don't really care at all about what happens to these people".

References

External links 
 
 

2019 films
2019 action thriller films
American action thriller films
2010s English-language films
American remakes of French films
English-language Netflix original films
Films directed by Joe Lynch
Films produced by Joe Carnahan
Films set in Cincinnati
Films shot in Ohio
Gaumont Film Company films
2010s American films